Trever Keith (born May 28, 1969) is an American musician, producer and record label owner from Victorville, California, United States. He is the founding member of the So-Cal punk group Face to Face and has been the singer and guitarist of the band since their inception in 1991. Keith is also the owner and founder of the independent record labels Lady Luck Records, Antagonist Records and Folsom Records.

Outside of his work with Face to Face, Keith was also a part of the remix and mash-up duo The Legion of Doom and alternative rock group Viva Death.  Additionally, in February 2008 he released a solo album titled Melancholics Anonymous.

Biography

Pre-Face to Face
After graduating high school in 1987, Keith formed a metal band with friends Matt Riddle, Matthew Altmire, and Rick Altmire. The band was named Victoria Manor. The band played shows in the high desert and recorded a three-song demo.  After several years the band members parted ways and Keith and Riddle formed a new band called Zero Tolerance with drummer Rob Kurth and guitarist Mark Haake.  Zero Tolerance drew heavily upon Keith's new wave influences but like Victoria Manor last just a short period of time.

Face to Face
After Zero Tolerance disbanded in early 1991, Keith formed Face to Face with bassist Matt Riddle and drummer Rob Kurth.  Cited as a seminal California punk group, Face to Face has released nine full-length albums in their nearly 25-year history.  In 2004 Face to Face disbanded to allow the band members the opportunity to focus on other projects.  During this time, the band released a CD/DVD compilation, Shoot the Moon, on Keith's label, Antagonist Records. The DVD features a career retrospective documentary 'Punk Rock Eats Its Own - A Film About Face to Face' along with the band's final performance from their 'Only Goodbye Tour' at the House Of Blues in Los Angeles, CA on September 19, 2004.

On January 29, 2008, Keith announced via Face to Face's official website that the band had reunited, for a number of shows in the US. On April 5, 2008, the band performed together for the first time in four years at The Bamboozle Left festival in Orange County, CA.  Since then the band has continued to perform numerous live shows since and has recorded 3 more records.

Outside Face to Face
In 1999 Keith produced the album Blindside by the band Peel fronted by former Ridel High singer Kevin Ridel.  After Face to Face's initial break up in 2004, Keith retreated out of the limelight to focus on several music projects including, his debut solo record, his record label Antagonist Records, and also formed the remix / mash-up duo The Legion of Doom with creative partner Chad Blinman. Keith also contributed to the Once Percent Panic album as member of the band Viva Death along with face to face bassist Scott Shiflett. Also, Keith was a guest vocalist on "People Like You Are Why People Like Me Exist" by Say Anything.

Solo career
In February 2008, Keith released his debut solo album Melancholics Anonymous on his own label Antagonist Records. The album was also released digitally via his official website, where it was available to purchase for the price of $5, and available to stream in full for free. The CD version was limited to 1000 hand-signed & numbered copies, available only during his solo tour in 2008 and Warped Tour 2010. His Americana single "Heading South" dropped on May 28, 2021.

Production
Keith has recorded and produced several records, most notably for Vagrant Records bands No Motiv and Moneen. Keith has also produced records for Viva Death, Death On Wednesday, Jughead's Revenge and Seconds To Go.

Selected discography

Singles

 "Heading South" (2021)

References

1969 births
Living people
American male singers
American punk rock singers
American punk rock guitarists
Singers from California
Place of birth missing (living people)
People from Victorville, California
Guitarists from California
Face to Face (punk band) members
Viva Death members
20th-century American guitarists
American male guitarists
20th-century American male musicians